Alban Lenoir (born 16 December 1980) is a French actor, screenwriter and stuntman. He was nominated for a Lumières Award for his leading role in the film French Blood (2015).

Career
As a stuntman, he has worked on Les Brigades du Tigre (2006), Taken (2008), Hero Corp (2008-2010), The Princess of Montpensier (2010), Outside the Law (2010), Point Blank (2010), Erased (2012).

Theater

Filmography

References

External links

1980 births
21st-century French male actors
Actors from Dijon
Living people
French male screenwriters
French screenwriters
Writers from Dijon